Tugwell is a surname, and may refer to:

 A. P. Tugwell
 Chris Tugwell, Australian playwright
 Christopher Tugwell, South African artist
 Finn Tugwell
 Rexford Tugwell